Wilfred Burns (1917 – 25 September 1990) was a British composer of film scores.

Born Bernard Wilfred Harris he was severely wounded in WW2 in 1940. Shot in the left elbow, right hand and left eye he eventually recovered from his injuries and remained a POW until repatriated on medical grounds in 1943. His recovery involved dealing with the complete loss of his left eye along with restoring vision to his right. The injury to his left elbow left that arm shorter than his right and the injury to his right hand required therapy to restore strength and dexterity to the fingers. After recuperation in several German prison hospitals he was able to play the piano again.

Selected filmography
 Something in the City (1950)
 There Is Another Sun (1951)
 Madame Louise (1951)
 Emergency Call (1952)
 Paul Temple Returns (1952)
 There Was a Young Lady (1953)
 Marilyn (1953)
 Forces' Sweetheart (1953)
 The Black Rider (1954)
 The Love Match (1955)
 Not So Dusty (1956)
 Assignment Redhead (1956)
 Man from Tangier (1957)
 Them Nice Americans (1958)
 The Hand (1960)
 Enter Inspector Duval (1961) "The broken horseshoe" ( 1960)
 Ambush in Leopard Street (1962)
 The London Nobody Knows (1967)
 Till Death Us Do Part (1969)
 Love Is a Splendid Illusion (1970)
 Dad's Army (1971)
 Adolf Hitler: My Part in His Downfall (1973)

References

External links

1917 births
1990 deaths
World War II prisoners of war held by Germany
Military personnel from Herefordshire
British military personnel of World War II
British World War II prisoners of war
People from Herefordshire
British film score composers
British male film score composers
20th-century classical musicians
20th-century British composers
20th-century British male musicians